This is a list of Italian football transfers featuring at least one Serie A or Serie B club which were completed after the end of the 2013–14 season and before the end of the 2013 summer transfer window. The window formally opened on 1 July 2014  and closed on 1 September (2 months), but Lega Serie A and Lega Serie B accepted to document any transfer before that day; however those players would only able to play for their new club at the start of 2014–15 season. Free agent could join any club at any time.
This list doesn't include co-ownership resolutions, which had to be renewed or resolved no later than June 20, 2014.

July to September 2014
Legend
Those clubs in Italic indicated that the player already left on loan in previous season or 2014 new signing that immediately left the club

Footnotes

References
general
 
 
specific

Italian
2013–14 in Italian football
2014